Angriff may refer to:

 Angriff!, a collectible miniatures game
 "Angriff", a song by Front Line Assembly off their album Improvised Electronic Device
 Der Angriff (film), a 1988 West German television movie
 Der Angriff, a Nazi newspaper